Leighlin may refer to:

 Old Leighlin, medieval town in County Carlow, Ireland
 Leighlinbridge, nearby modern town
 Old Leighlin (Parliament of Ireland constituency), abolished 1800
 Bishop of Leighlin, former Christian diocese in Ireland
 Baron Brereton of Leighlin, title in the Peerage of Ireland 1624–1722